Canada's men's national soccer team and its players hold the following competitive records.

Honours

Senior Team

Major Competitions 

 CONCACAF Championship / Gold Cup:
 Winners (2): 1985, 2000
 Third place: 2002

North American Competition 

 North American Nations Cup:
 Winners: 1990

Olympic Games 

 Summer Olympics:
  Gold medalists: 1904

 CONCACAF Olympic Qualifying Tournament:
 Runners-up: 1984

Individual records 

Players in bold are still active with Canada.

Most capped players

Top goalscorers 

Most appearances  101 – Atiba Hutchinson 
Longest international career  22 years – Pat Onstad from 1988 to 2010 
Most goals  25 – Cyle Larin 
Most goals in one game  3 – John Catliff vs  in 1988, Alex Bunbury vs  in 1992, Simeon Jackson vs  in 2011, Lucas Cavallini vs  in 2019, Jonathan David vs  in 2019, Junior Hoilett vs  in 2019, Cyle Larin vs  in 2021, Lucas Cavallini vs  in 2021, and Jonathan David vs  in 2021

Most goals in one year  14 –  Cyle Larin in 2021 
Most consecutive games with at least one goal  4 – Dale Mitchell, Ali Gerba, Cyle Larin
Most penalty kicks scored  7 – Dwayne De Rosario 
Least amount of time in between two consecutive goals  1 minute – Tom Kouzmanis vs  in 1995 
Most appearances before scoring a first international goal  49 – Nik Ledgerwood vs  in 2016 
Fastest goal from kickoff  2nd minute – Bob Lenarduzzi vs  in 1980, Alphonso Davies vs  in 2022 
Latest goal in regulation time  90+5th minute – Sam Adekugbe vs  in 2022, Lucas Cavallini vs  in 2022 
Latest goal in extra time  120th minute – John Catliff vs  in 1990 
Most goals in a debut  2 – Art Hughes, Dale Mitchell, Nick Papadakis, Tom Kouzmanis, Jonathan David

Team records
First game  2–3 loss to  June 7, 1924 
First win  1–0 win against  June 14, 1924 
Biggest win  11–0 vs  on March 29, 2021 
Biggest loss  0–8 vs  June 18, 1993 
Most goals scored in one game  11 vs  on March 29, 2021
Longest winning streak  8 games – from March 25, 2021, vs  to July 15, 2021, vs  
Longest undefeated streak  15 games – from September 2, 1999, vs  to June 4, 2000, vs  
Longest losing streak  8 games – from October 31, 1974, vs  to August 10, 1975, vs  
Longest winless streak  16 games – from October 16, 2012, vs  to May 27, 2014, vs  
Longest goalless streak  959 minutes – from March 22, 2013, vs  to May 23, 2014, vs  
Longest clean sheet streak  567 minutes – from January 19, 2015, vs  to July 11, 2015, vs

Competitive record

<div style="text-align:left">

CONCACAF Nations League

*Denotes draws include knockout matches decided via penalty shoot-out.

*Denotes draws include knockout matches decided via penalty shoot-out.
**Silver background colour indicates that the tournament was held on home soil. Gold background colour indicates that the tournament was won.

Pan American Games record
1951 – did not enter
1955 – did not enter
1959 – did not enter
1963 – did not enter
1967 – fourth place
1971 – fifth place
1975 – round 2
1979 – did not enter
1983 – did not enter
1987 – round 999
1991 – round 1
1995 – did not enter
1999 – fourth place
2003 – did not enter
2007 – did not enter

NAFC Championship record
1947 – did not enter
1949 – did not enter
1990 – champions
1991 – third place

Olympic Games record

*Denotes draws including knockout matches decided via penalty shoot-out.
**Gold background colour indicates that the tournament was won. Red border colour indicates tournament was held on home soil.

Head-to-head record
Key

The following table shows Canada's all-time official international record per opponent:

See also
 Canada men's national soccer team
 List of Canada international soccer players

References

External links
Canada Soccer Records & Results 2022

Canada men's national soccer team